Tukutnut (also, Santa Teresa and Tucutnut) is a former Rumsen settlement in Monterey County, California. 

References

Rumsen villages
Former settlements in Monterey County, California
Former Native American populated places in California
Lost Native American populated places in the United States